Saladukha is a surname. Notable people with the surname include:

 Hleb Saladukha (born 1994), Belarusian sprint canoeist
 Olha Saladuha (born 1983), Ukrainian triple jumper

See also
 

Belarusian-language surnames
Ukrainian-language surnames